Asylgade (lit. "Asylum Street") is a street in the Old Town of Copenhagen, Denmark. It runs from Vingårdstræde in the north to Laksegade in the south.

History

The street was originally called Nellikegade. Copenhagen's first daycare (Asylum) for children of women working outside the home opened at No. 11 in 1835. The street received its current name after it in 1859. The institution moved to new premises in Adelgade in 1937.

Buildings

The corner building at Asylgade 2 / Vingårdstræde 9 was built in 1797 for ship builder Lars Larsen. The corner building at Asylgade 8 / Dybensgade 1 was built by master builder  Johan Diderich Backhausen (1771-1850) in 1796 . Nest to it is a four-bay, four-storey building.

The building at Asylgade 7 / Laksegade 8-10 was built in 1914-1916 for Landmandsbanken  to design by Bernhard Ingemann. The building at Asylgade 1-3 /corner with Vingårdsstræde) is a multi-storey parking facility from 1969. It was designed by Tyge Holm & Flemming Grut.

References

External links

 Asylgade at indenforvoldene.dk

Streets in Copenhagen